European Flavour Association (EFFA) is a non-profit European-level trade association of the flavor industry, based in Brussels, Belgium. Founded in 1961, the organisation originally focused on both flavours and fragrances, but has focused solely on flavours since 2006. Its members include 12 national (covering approximately 300 SME's) and 10 direct member companies.

Purpose
EFFA helps to promote and coordinate Europe's flavour industry, which accounts for approximately one-third of the global market and includes more than 300 businesses employing 10,000 skilled workers. In addition, EFFA helps to coordinate regulatory positions within the industry and information about flavourings for the general public.

EFFA welcomed the European Commission (EC) Regulation on Flavourings and has published a Guidance Document on the EC Regulation on Flavourings that is available at its public website: http://effa.eu/library/guidance-documents

History
The association was founded in 1961. It was originally called the "Bureau de Liaison des Syndicats Européens des Produits Aromatiques". Thirty years later, this name was officially changed to the European Flavour and Fragrance Association (EFFA). EFFA is based in Brussels, Belgium.

In 2009, changes in how the flavour and fragrance industries were regulated led to EFFA to divide into two organisations. After that date, EFFA focused solely on the flavour industry, while the International Fragrance Organisation - Europe (IFRA) assumed responsibility for the fragrance industry in Europe.

On 20 June 2017, EFFA hosted the "FlavourDay" in Brussels to bring together food and flavouring industry experts. Additional FlavourDays were held later that year in Copenhagen, London and Paris, and continues in 2018, starting with Istanbul. The FlavourDay campaign was shortlisted by the 2018 Transform Awards for "Best implementation of a brand development project across multiple markets" and by the 2018 European Association Awards for "Best Association Networking Event".

Members
EFFA's members include the national flavour associations of Austria, Belgium, Denmark, France, Germany, Italy, the Netherlands, Spain, Sweden, Switzerland, Turkey, and the UK.

Company members include Firmenich, Givaudan, Mane, Robertet, International Flavors and Fragrances, Symrise, Takasago, Kerry Group, and Sensient Flavors. In January 2018, McCormick & Company joined as an EFFA full member.

EFFA is itself a member of the International Organization of the Flavor Industry (IOFI).

References

External links
EFFA homepage

Flavors
Trade associations based in Belgium
Pan-European food industry trade groups